Monica Anderson is an American computer scientist who is an associate professor of Computer Science at the University of Alabama. Anderson works on robotics, with a focus on multi-agent systems, multi-robot systems, and user interfaces. Anderson received the UPE Excellence in Instruction Award in 2008, and co-organized the AAAI 2008 Workshop on Mobility and Manipulation at the Twenty-Third AAAI Conference on Artificial Intelligence.

Education 
Anderson earned a B.S. degree in Computer Science from Chicago State University in 1990, and a PhD in Computer Science and Engineering from the University of Minnesota in 2006.

Research 
Anderson is director of the Distributed Autonomy Lab at the Computer Science Department at the University of Alabama, which includes several projects related to multi-agent and multi-robot systems and user interfaces, and their effect on trust. Outcomes from these projects include identification of mitigating factors on operator's trust of autonomous systems, mechanisms for increasing self-efficacy in computer science introductory courses using robotics, and approaches on improving the design of autonomous device frameworks.

References 

Living people
American computer scientists
University of Alabama faculty
African-American engineers
University of Minnesota College of Science and Engineering alumni
Chicago State University alumni
Year of birth missing (living people)
African-American computer scientists
21st-century African-American people